Chasmodes bosquianus, the striped blenny, is a species of combtooth blenny found in the western Atlantic ocean, from New York to Florida. The specific name uses the suffix-ianus to denote "belonging to" and refers to the French naturalist Louis Augustin Guillaume Bosc (1759-1828), whose notes Bernard Germain de Lacépède used to base his description of this blenny.

References

striped blenny
Fish of the Eastern United States
Fauna of the Southeastern United States
striped blenny